Batillipes is genus of tardigrades, the only genus in the family Batillipedidae. It was first described by Ferdinand Richters in 1909.

Species
The genus includes the following species:

 Batillipes acaudatus Pollock, 1971
 Batillipes acuticauda Menechella, Bulnes & Cazzaniga, 2015
 Batillipes adriaticus Grimaldi de Zio, Morone De Lucia, D'Addabbo Gallo & Grimaldi, 1979
 Batillipes africanus Morone De Lucia, D’Addabbo Gallo & Grimaldi de Zio, 1988
 Batillipes algharbensis Santos, Rubal, Veiga, da Rocha & Fontoura, 2018
 Batillipes amblypyge Menechella, Bulnes & Cazzaniga, 2017
 Batillipes annulatus de Zio, 1962
 Batillipes brasiliensis Santos, da Rocha, Gomes & Fontoura, 2017
 Batillipes bullacaudatus McGinty & Higgins, 1968
 Batillipes carnonensis Fize, 1957
 Batillipes crassipes Tchesunov & Mokievsky, 1995
 Batillipes dandarae Santos, da Rocha, Gomes & Fontoura, 2017
 Batillipes dicrocercus Pollock, 1970
 Batillipes friaufi Riggin, 1962
 Batillipes gilmartini McGinty, 1969
 Batillipes lesteri Kristensen & Mackness, 2000
 Batillipes lingularum Menechella, Bulnes & Cazzaniga, 2017
 Batillipes littoralis Renaud-Debyser, 1959
 Batillipes longispinosus Chang & Rho, 1997
 Batillipes lusitanus Santos, Rubal, Veiga, da Rocha & Fontoura, 2018
 Batillipes marcelli Morone De Lucia, D'Addabbo Gallo & Grimaldi de Zio, 1988
 Batillipes mirus Richters, 1909
 Batillipes minius Rubal, Veiga, Fontoura & Sousa-Pinto, 2016
 Batillipes noerrevangi Kristensen, 1978
 Batillipes orientalis Chang & Rho, 1997
 Batillipes pennaki Marcus, 1946
 Batillipes philippinensis Chang & Rho, 1997
 Batillipes phreaticus Renaud Debyser, 1959
 Batillipes potiguarensis Santos, da Rocha, Gomes & Fontoura, 2017
 Batillipes roscoffensis Kristensen, 1978
 Batillipes rotundiculus Rho, Min & Chang, 1999
 Batillipes similis Schulz, 1955
 Batillipes solitarius Jørgensen, Boesgaard, Møbjerg & Kristensen, 2014
 Batillipes spinicauda Gallo D’Addabbo, Sandulli & de Zio Grimaldi, 2005
 Batillipes tridentatus Pollock, 1989
 Batillipes tubernatis Pollock, 1971

References

Publications

Richters, Tardigraden-Studien. Bericht der Senckenbergische Naturforschenden Gesellschaft, 1909, vol. 40 p. 28-45 
Ramazzotti, Il Phylum Tardigrada. Memorie Istituto di Idrobiologia, 1962, vol. 14, p. 1-395. 

Tardigrade genera
Arthrotardigrada